Ruth Roche may refer to:

 Ruth Roche, Baroness Fermoy (1908–1993), friend and confidante of Queen Elizabeth The Queen Mother and the maternal grandmother of Diana, Princess of Wales
 Ruth Roche (comics) (1917–1983), comics writer and editor